[[File:Record Mirror First Chart.jpg|thumb|right|A copy of the Record Mirror'''s first ever chart, released on 22 January 1955]]
The Record Mirror is a former British weekly pop music newspaper. From 1955 until 1962, the Record Mirror compiled its own record chart which was used by many national newspapers. It formed as a rival to the existing chart published by NME. The Mirrors chart was based on the postal returns from record stores that were financed by the newspaper, whereas the rival chart in the NME was based on a telephone poll. On 22 January 1955, the Mirror published its first chart, compiled using figures from 24 shops. The first chart-topper was "Mambo Italiano" by Rosemary Clooney, with the newspaper having compiled a Top Ten. The chart was expanded from a Top Ten to a Top Twenty on 8 October 1955. In the early 1960s some national newspapers switched to using a chart compiled by Melody Maker and, ultimately, the cost of collecting sales figures by post led to the chart's demise. On 24 March 1962, the paper stopped compiling its own chart and started publishing Record Retailer's Top 50.

Record charts in the United Kingdom began life on 14 November 1952 when NME imitated an idea started in American Billboard magazine and began compiling a hit parade. Prior to 15 February 1969, when the British Market Research Bureau chart was established, there had been no universally accepted chart. During this time the BBC used aggregated results of charts from the Mirror and other sources to compile the Pick of the Pops chart. However, according to The Official Charts Company and Guinness' British Hit Singles & Albums, the NME is considered the official British singles chart before 10 March 1960. After that date and until 1969 a chart compiled by Record Retailer is considered the official British singles chart.

Dean Martin's song "Naughty Lady of Shady Lane" was the first to have a number-one in the Record Mirror chart but not to be awarded the top spot in NMEs chart. There are five more songs that, like Martin's, reached number-one on the Record Mirror chart but are not classified as number-one by the UK Singles Chart. Additionally, the Record Mirror and other charts differed about what they classified as the top song of the year. Record Mirror classified The Everly Brothers' "All I Have to Do Is Dream"/"Claudette" as the top single of 1958 while the UK Singles Chart best-selling single of that year was Elvis Presley's "Jailhouse Rock". Furthermore, despite never reaching number-one, Pat Boone's "Love Letters in the Sand" was classified by Record Mirror'' as the best-selling song of 1957; the song entered the chart at number eleven on 13 July and, later, charted in the top three positions for 9 consecutive weeks.

Number-one singles

Notes

References

Lists of number-one songs in the United Kingdom